The Glacier Bay water shrew (Sorex alaskanus) is a species of mammal in the family Soricidae. It is endemic to Alaska in the United States. It can swim underwater, and when it stops swimming, air trapped in its fur lets it float back up to the surface. Owing to small hairs on its feet, the water shrew can run across the water. Its fur is water resistant, although if it does get wet it returns to shore to dry itself with its hind feet. It eats aquatic fly nymphs and terrestrial invertebrates.

References

Mammals of the United States
Sorex
Taxonomy articles created by Polbot
Mammals described in 1900
Endemic fauna of Alaska